Donauinsel  is a station on  of the Vienna U-Bahn. It is located on Donauinsel Island, in the Donaustadt district. It opened in 1982. The station is below the Reichsbrücke bridge.

References

External links 
 

Buildings and structures in Donaustadt
Railway stations opened in 1982
Vienna U-Bahn stations
1982 establishments in Austria
Railway stations in Austria opened in the 20th century